The Loosemore–Hanby index measures disproportionality of electoral systems, how much the principle of one person, one vote is violated. It computes the absolute difference between votes cast and seats obtained using the formula:

,

where
 is the vote share and
 the seat share of party

such that ,

This index is minimized by the largest remainder (LR) method with the Hare quota. Any apportionment method that minimizes it will always apportion identically to LR-Hare. Other methods, including the widely used divisor methods such as the Webster/Sainte-Laguë method or the D'Hondt method minimize the Sainte-Laguë index instead.

The index is named after John Loosemore and Victor J. Hanby, who first published the formula in 1971 in a paper entitled "The Theoretical Limits of Maximum Distortion: Some Analytic Expressions for Electoral Systems". Along with Douglas W. Rae's, the formula is one of the two most cited disproportionality indices.
Whereas the Rae index measures the average deviation, the Loosemore–Hanby index measures the total deviation. Michael Gallagher used least squares to develop the Gallagher index, which takes a middle ground between the Rae and Loosemore–Hanby indices.

The LH index is related to the Schutz index of inequality, which is defined as 

where  is the expected share of individual  and  her allocated share. Under the LH index, parties take the place of individuals, vote shares replace expectation shares, and seat shares allocation shares. The LH index is also related to the dissimilarity index of segregation. All three indexes are special cases of the more general  index of dissimilarity. The LH index is related to the amount of unrepresented vote, which only measures the difference between votes cast and seats obtained for parties which did not obtain any seats. 

The complement of the LH index is called Party Total Representativity, also called Rose index R. The Rose index is typically expressed in % and can be calculated by subtracting the LH index from 1:

.

Example of calculating distortion

Netherlands 
This table uses the 2021 Dutch general election result. The Netherlands uses a nationwide party list system, with seats allocated by the D'Hondt method. The low figure achieved through this calculation suggests the election was very proportional.

Application

Europe 
The following table displays a calculation of the Rose Index by Nohlen of the most, or second most, recent legislative election in each European country prior to 2009. This calculation ranges from 0-100, with 100 being the most proportional score possible, and 0 the least. Parties which received less than 0.5% of the vote were not included.

Notes

Software implementation 

 Loosemore-Hanby Index in PolRep, an R package.

References

Psephology
Electoral systems